Richwood Hall, also known as Richwoods, is a house near Charles Town, West Virginia.  The lands once belonged to George Washington, who received them from Thomas Fairfax, 6th Lord Fairfax of Cameron and subsequently gave to his brother, Samuel Washington. It was Samuel's son, Lawrence Augustine Washington, who built or moved into the house with his bride, Mary Dorcas Wood, in 1797.  This original house now forms a wing of the present enlarged house.  The Washingtons lived at Richwoods until 1802, when they sold the property to Smith Slaughter. By 1829 the house had been enlarged, either by Slaughter or his successor, Joseph Shewater. In any case, materials, including bricks and carved wood were imported from England.

At the time of the American Civil War the property belonged to John R. Flagg. Forces under the command of General Jubal A. Early fired from Richwood Hall at Union forces under Sheridan at Locust Hill.

References 

American Civil War sites in West Virginia
Neoclassical architecture in West Virginia
Federal architecture in West Virginia
Houses completed in 1797
Houses in Jefferson County, West Virginia
Houses on the National Register of Historic Places in West Virginia
Jefferson County, West Virginia in the American Civil War
National Register of Historic Places in Jefferson County, West Virginia
Washington family residences